Cladonia albofuscescens is a species of cup lichen in the family Cladoniaceae. It is found in South America, and grows in tropical moist broadleaf forests.

References

albofuscescens
Lichen species
Lichens described in 1899
Lichens of South America
Taxa named by Edvard August Vainio